Anderston/City/Yorkhill (Ward 10) is one of the 23 wards of Glasgow City Council. Created as Anderston/City in 2007, it returned four council members, using the single transferable vote system. The same criteria applied in 2012. For the 2017 Glasgow City Council election, the boundaries were changed, the ward slightly decreased in size (although slightly increased in population) and was renamed Anderston/City/Yorkhill, still returning four councillors.

Boundaries
The ward covers Glasgow city centre and the Merchant City which contain many office and retail premises but also some residential buildings, and also includes the more heavily populated areas of Cowcaddens, Garnethill and Townhead north of the city centre, along with the campuses of both the University of Strathclyde and Glasgow Caledonian University, with the M8 motorway being the northern boundary and High Street the eastern. The River Clyde forms the southern border of the ward, which stretches west through Anderston, Finnieston, Kelvinhaugh and Yorkhill to the River Kelvin.

The Kelvingrove residential area to the north of Finnieston lies within the ward, but Kelvingrove Park and the Park District which were also originally included in 2007 were reassigned to Hillhead ward in 2017. At that time the small Ladywell neighbourhood and the grounds of Glasgow Royal Infirmary were reassigned to a new Dennistoun ward. 'Yorkhill' was added to the name to better reflect the distribution of population, with most of the ward's residents living in areas west of Anderston.

The ethnic makeup of the Anderston/City/Yorkhill ward using the 2011 census population statistics was: 
75.9% White Scottish / British / Irish / Other
18.1% Asian (mainly Chinese)
2.8% Black (mainly African)
3% Mixed / Other Ethnic Group

Councillors

Election Results

2022 Election
2022 Glasgow City Council election

2017 Election
2017 Glasgow City Council election

2012 Election
2012 Glasgow City Council election

2015 by-election
On 14 May 2015, SNP Cllr Martin Docherty resigned his after having been elected as an MP for the constituency of West Dunbartonshire. A by-election was held on 6 August 2015 and was won by the SNP's Eva Bolander.

2016 by-election
On 14 March 2016, Labour Cllr Gordon Matheson resigned his seat as he had been appointed a visiting professor at Strathclyde University. A by-election took place on 5 May 2016 and it was won by the SNP's Angus Millar.

2007 Election
2007 Glasgow City Council election

See also
Wards of Glasgow

References

External links
Listed Buildings in Anderston/City/Yorkhill Ward, Glasgow City at British Listed Buildings

Wards of Glasgow